"The Prisoner of the Caucasus", also translated to "A Prisoner in the Caucausus", is an 1872 novella written by Leo Tolstoy.  The story is based on a real incident in his life while he was serving in the Russian military.  It is about two soldiers kidnapped by their rivals for ransom who were in custody for some time.  They tried to escape twice, were caught the first time, but succeeded the second. The novella was acclaimed for its view of humanity in the face of conflict.

Prisoner of the Mountains, a 1996 Russian film, was based on the novella.

See also
 Bibliography of Leo Tolstoy
 Twenty-Three Tales
 Russian conquest of the Caucasus
 The Prisoner of the Caucasus, a narrative poem by Alexander Pushkin

References

External links
 Complete Text
 The Captive of the Caucasus, from RevoltLib.com
 The Captive of the Caucasus, from Marxists.org

Short stories by Leo Tolstoy
Short stories adapted into films